Treaty of New York may refer to:

 Treaty of New York (1790), between the United States and the Creek Indians
 Treaty of New York (1796), between New York State and the Seven Nations of Canada
 Treaty of New York (1826), on which see Ocmulgee National Monument